The Long Night of Museums, or the Night of Museums, and, since 2005, the European Night of Museums, is a cultural event in which museums and cultural institutions to remain open late into the night to introduce themselves to new potential patrons.  Visitors are given a common entrance pass which grants them access to all exhibits as well as complimentary public transportation within the area.

The first  took place in Berlin in 1997. The concept was very well received. In 2005 the Council of Europe, UNESCO and the International Council of Museums joined to promote this event with the goal of improving access to culture.

Museum Night takes place on the third Saturday of May. Most recently in 2021, some 1200 museums in 120 cities throughout Europe, as well as other nations including Argentina and the Philippines, welcomed nearly 2 million visitors to their collections.

Participants

Europe 

  in Berlin and other cities of Germany including Cologne, Frankfurt, Stuttgart, Düsseldorf, Munich, Hamburg, Kassel and Heidelberg/Mannheim/Ludwigshafen
  in Paris, and La Nuit des Musées in France
  event in Amsterdam, Netherlands
 Coordinated long nights in Austria, Italy and Liechtenstein,  organized by ORF
 In Switzerland long nights have taken place in Basel, Bern, Lucerne, St. Gallen and Zürich. Some  are also organized in Lausanne, Fribourg and Geneva.
  in Poland, where the first edition took place in 2003 in Poznań in the Poznań National Museum; now over 150 cities and towns take a part in this event.
  in Hungary
 "Night of museums and galleries" in Bulgaria,  "The Night" has become a successful cultural product - emblematic for Sofia and Plovdiv - that attracts tens of thousands of visitors.
 Museums at Night in the UK, including museums in Great Yarmouth
  in Barcelona, Spain
 Museum Night Fever in Brussels, Belgium
  in Croatia, since 2005, where admission fees to all venues are waived for the night.
  in Prague, Czech Republic
  in Georgia, since 2015
  in Lithuania, since 2005
  in Russia,
  in Romania,
  /  in Serbia, since 2005
  in Latvia, since 2005
  in Armenia, since 2005
  in Tampere, Finland, since 2008
  in Estonia, since 2009
  in Slovakia
  in Ukraine, since 2009
  /  in Republic of Srpska, Bosnia and Herzegovina, since 2006

Latin 
  in Buenos Aires, Argentina, where first edition took place in 2004. Since then, the number of museums and "barrios" (neighbourhoods) participating in the event has risen considerably. The 2013 edition featured 189 museums and cultural institutions that received more than 800,000 visitors.

Asia 
  or Night of Heritage in Cebu, Philippines, started in 2007, first in the Asia-Pacific Region
 Nuit Blanche (白晝之夜) in Zhongzhen Dist, Taipei, Taiwan, started in 2016.  The first Nuit Blanche Taipei was held in 2016 which was invited by Bureau Français de Taipei. To highlight Taipei’s art capacity internationally, this event links Taipei and international cities, increasing international cultural capital exchange and raising the city’s international profile through varied cultural performances. The 7th Nuit Blanche is in Shihlin Dist, Taipei held on 2 October to 3 October 2022.

History
The current all-night festivals trace their roots to several cities.

The first Long Night of Museums took place in the newly re-united Berlin in 1997 with a dozen participating institutions and exhibitions; since then the number has risen to 125 with over 150,000 people taking part in the January 2005 night.

It drew on a European heritage of all-night cultural events, such as the annual White Nights Festival, a long-standing cultural festival in St Petersburg.

The Mayor of Paris Bertrand Delanoë took this idea in 2002 and spread it to culture more broadly, including performing arts, and under the banner of Nuit Blanche (White Nights, and various related names) the concept has spread around the world.

References

External links

Culture night in Dublin
Night of the Museums in Barcelona
Museum night in Russia
Museum night in Serbia
Museumsnacht Basel

Recurring events established in 1997
Museum events
Festivals in Berlin
Long Night of Museums
1997 establishments in Germany
Night in culture